The Erdős–Gallai theorem is a result in graph theory, a branch of combinatorial mathematics. It provides one of two known approaches to solving the graph realization problem, i.e. it gives a necessary and sufficient condition for a finite sequence of natural numbers to be the degree sequence of a simple graph. A sequence obeying these conditions is called "graphic". The theorem was published in 1960 by Paul Erdős and Tibor Gallai, after whom it is named.

Statement
A sequence of non-negative integers  can be represented as the degree sequence of a finite simple graph on n vertices if and only if  is even and

 

Proofs
It is not difficult to show that the conditions of the Erdős–Gallai theorem are necessary for a sequence of numbers to be graphic. The requirement that the sum of the degrees be even is the handshaking lemma, already used by Euler in his 1736 paper on the bridges of Königsberg. The inequality between the sum of the  largest degrees and the sum of the remaining degrees can be established by double counting: the left side gives the numbers of edge-vertex adjacencies among the  highest-degree vertices, each such adjacency must either be on an edge with one or two high-degree endpoints, the  term on the right gives the maximum possible number of edge-vertex adjacencies in which both endpoints have high degree, and the remaining term on the right upper bounds the number of edges that have exactly one high degree endpoint. Thus, the more difficult part of the proof is to show that, for any sequence of numbers obeying these conditions, there exists a graph for which it is the degree sequence.

 consider a sequence of "subrealizations", graphs whose degrees are upper bounded by the given degree sequence. They show that, if G is a subrealization, and i is the smallest index of a vertex in G whose degree is not equal to di, then G may be modified in a way that produces another subrealization, increasing the degree of vertex i without changing the degrees of the earlier vertices in the sequence. Repeated steps of this kind must eventually reach a realization of the given sequence, proving the theorem.

Relation to integer partitions
 describe close connections between the Erdős–Gallai theorem and the theory of integer partitions.
Under majorization of their prefix sums, the partitions form a lattice, in which the minimal change between an individual partition and another partition lower in the partition order is to subtract one from one of the numbers  and add it to a number  that is smaller by at least two ( could be zero). As Aigner and Triesch show, this operation preserves the property of being graphic, so to prove the Erdős–Gallai theorem it suffices to characterize the graphic sequences that are maximal in this majorization order. They provide such a characterization, in terms of the Ferrers diagrams of the corresponding partitions, and show that it is equivalent to the Erdős–Gallai theorem.

Graphic sequences for other types of graphs
Similar theorems describe the degree sequences of simple directed graphs, simple directed graphs with loops, and simple bipartite graphs . The first problem is characterized by the Fulkerson–Chen–Anstee theorem. The latter two cases, which are equivalent, are characterized by the Gale–Ryser theorem.

Stronger version
If an even-summed positive sequence d has no repeated entries other than the maximum and the minimum (and the length exceeds
the largest entry), then it suffices to check only the th inequality, where .

Generalization

See also
Havel–Hakimi algorithm

References
.

.

Gallai theorem
Theorems in graph theory